"Just Because of You" is a song by German–American boy band US5. It was written by Dashiel Andrews, MM Dollar, Mike Michaels, Sammy Naja, and Jay "TK-Roxx" Khan for their debut studio album Here We Go (2005), while production was helmed by Dollar, Michaels, and Naja. The song reached the top 5 in Austria and Germany.

Track listings

Notes
 denotes additional producer

Charts

Weekly charts

Year-end charts

References

External links                 
 

2005 singles
US5 songs